The Girl in the Picture is a 1985 Scottish film directed by Cary Parker and starring John Gordon Sinclair as Alan, a Glaswegian photographer, keen to get back with his former girlfriend Mary (Irina Brook). Meanwhile, his assistant Ken (played by David McKay) is smitten by a girl he knows only through her photograph.

The film also stars Gregor Fisher, Rikki Fulton and Simone Lahbib, with a score composed by Scottish musician Ron Geesin.

External links
 

1985 films
1985 comedy-drama films
British comedy-drama films
Films set in Glasgow
The Samuel Goldwyn Company films
1980s English-language films
1980s British films